The Chroniosuchidae are a family of semi-aquatic reptiliomorph amphibians found in sediments from the upper Permian and the upper Triassic periods, most in Russia. They were generally rather large animals, with long jaws similar to those found in modern crocodiles, and probably lived a similar life style as riverside piscivores and ambush predators. Like all Chroniosuchians, they bore extensive osteoderm armour on their backs, possibly as protection against terrestrial predators such as the Permian therapsids and the Triassic Rauisuchians.

Phylogeny

Below is the cladogram from Buchwitz et al. (2012) showing the phylogenetic relations of chroniosuchids:

See also 
 Permian tetrapods

References 

Permian animals
Triassic tetrapods
Chroniosuchians